The yellowfin shiner (Notropis lutipinnis) is a species of ray-finned fish in the genus Notropis. It is native to the southeastern United States, where it occurs in North Carolina, South Carolina, and Georgia

References 

 Robert Jay Goldstein, Rodney W. Harper, Richard Edwards: American Aquarium Fishes. Texas A&M University Press 2000, p. 100
 

Notropis
Fish described in 1878
Taxa named by David Starr Jordan